Bonita School District 16 is a school district in Graham County, Arizona.

References

External links
 

School districts in Graham County, Arizona